The Division of Bennelong is an Australian electoral division in the state of New South Wales. The division was created in 1949 and is named after Woollarawarre Bennelong, an Aboriginal man befriended by the first Governor of New South Wales, Arthur Phillip. The seat is represented by Jerome Laxale since the 2022 Australian federal election

Bennelong covers 60 km2 of the Northern Sydney region, including all of the local government areas of Ryde and parts of Hornsby and Parramatta. It includes the suburbs of Denistone, Denistone East, Denistone West, East Ryde, Eastwood, Epping, Macquarie Park, Marsfield, Meadowbank, Melrose Park, North Epping, North Ryde, Putney, Ryde, Tennyson Point and West Ryde; as well as parts of Beecroft, Carlingford, Chatswood West, Dundas, Ermington and Gladesville.

It was represented from 1974 until 2007 by John Howard, who served as the Prime Minister of Australia from 1996 until 2007. As well as his government then being defeated, Howard also became the second sitting Australian Prime Minister to lose his own seat. Though historically a fairly safe Liberal seat, modern-day electoral boundaries and demographic changes have seen Bennelong become an increasingly marginal seat. The 2007 outcome in Bennelong resulted in Labor candidate Maxine McKew winning the seat on a thin 1.4 percent margin after a close contest, making her the first Labor MP for Bennelong. After a single term, McKew was defeated by Liberal candidate John Alexander in 2010, who retained it (not including a short vacancy in 2017) until the 2022 general election.

The seat was vacant from 11 November 2017 when Alexander resigned amid the 2017–18 Australian parliamentary eligibility crisis after confirming he was a dual citizen and therefore ineligible to sit in parliament. Despite a significant swing against him, Alexander was re-elected at the 2017 Bennelong by-election on 16 December.

Geography
Since 1984, federal electoral division boundaries in Australia have been determined at redistributions by a redistribution committee appointed by the Australian Electoral Commission. Redistributions occur for the boundaries of divisions in a particular state, and they occur every seven years, or sooner if a state's representation entitlement changes or when divisions of a state are malapportioned.

Electoral history

When the Division of Bennelong was created in 1949, it covered mainly the suburbs of Ryde, Hunters Hill and Lane Cove, all of which were (and still are) relatively affluent areas, and as such it has historically been a "fairly safe" Liberal seat.

Over the years Bennelong became increasingly marginal, and this has been attributed to two factors. Firstly, the electoral boundary of Bennelong has been redrawn ("redistributed") numerous times, pushing it further westward into Labor-friendly territory. Successive redistributions eliminated Lane Cove and Hunters Hill in the east and incorporated Eastwood, Epping, Carlingford and middle-class Ermington in the north and west. Secondly, the demographic has changed as well: since the early 1990s, Eastwood and surrounding suburbs have seen an influx of migrants from China, Hong Kong, South Korea and India, who are relatively affluent and conservative, but are sensitive towards political policies on immigration and multiculturalism.

1998 election
In 1998, Prime Minister John Howard finished just short of a majority on the first count in the seat, and was only assured of re-election on the ninth count. He ultimately won a fairly comfortable 56 percent of the two-party-preferred vote.

2004 election
In 2004, for the second time since becoming Prime Minister, Howard came up short of a majority in the first count for the seat. He was assured of re-election on the third count, ultimately winning 53.3 percent of the two-party-preferred vote. The two-party-preferred vote for the Liberals declined 3.4% in the 2004 election, contrary to a strong national trend to the Coalition (and a particularly strong one to the Coalition in outer-suburban metropolitan seats), making Bennelong a marginal seat at that time, with a margin of just 4.3%. The 2006 redistribution pushed this margin slightly further into Labor territory, due to the inclusion of the predominantly working-class and public housing suburb of Ermington in Bennelong's boundaries. The Greens increased their vote at this election by 12.34% to 16.37% at this election, owing to the pre-selection of the high-profile Andrew Wilkie as candidate.

2007 election
  In the 2007 election, the incumbent Member for Bennelong, then-Prime Minister John Howard, lost the seat to Labor candidate Maxine McKew, after holding it for 33 years. This was only the second time in Australian history that an incumbent Prime Minister had been defeated in his own electorate, the first being Stanley Bruce in 1929. The election marked the first time a Labor candidate won, and also the first time a woman won the seat.

In his national address conceding the election, Howard admitted that it was "very likely" that he had lost the seat, and many media outlets listed Bennelong as a Labor gain on election night. Following initial reluctance to officially call the outcome (despite confidence of success), McKew declared victory officially on 1 December. At that time, the Australian Electoral Commission showed McKew ahead on a two-candidate-preferred basis, by 43,272 votes to 41,159; however, pre-poll, postal and absent votes were still being counted and could possibly have affected the outcome.

Howard formally conceded defeat in Bennelong on 12 December. The Electoral Commission declared the seat, with 44,685 votes for McKew to 42,251 for Howard. McKew led for most of the night, and ultimately won on the 14th count after over three-fourths of Green preferences flowed to her. Voter turnout in Bennelong was 95%.

Polls

2010–17
For the 2010 federal election, the Liberal Party pre-selected former tennis professional and tennis commentator John Alexander to contest the marginal seat. McKew recontested the seat for Labor. After a long and high-profile campaign, Alexander won the seat back from Labor; he increased both the Liberals' two-party-preferred and primary vote for the first time since 2001, and gained the largest swing towards the Liberals since 1996. Alexander defeated McKew with a two-party-preferred swing of 4.52% (cf. the 2.58% national swing in the 2010 federal election), contributing to the Gillard Government's loss of its parliamentary majority.

McKew said Labor had failed to repeat the professional and targeted campaign of 2007. She also conceded that the removal of Kevin Rudd as Prime Minister had been a factor in the party's poor showing, along with the Government's dumping of the emissions trading scheme and a lacklustre national campaign.

Alexander picked up a four-percent swing in the 2013 federal election as the Coalition returned to government, returning Bennelong to its traditional status as a safe Liberal seat. He was reelected in 2016 with a small swing in his favour, even as the Coalition barely won a second term. On 11 November 2017, Alexander resigned his seat over questions of his eligibility to stand under section 44 of the Constitution, necessitating a by-election.

2017 by-election

Amid the 2017–18 Australian parliamentary eligibility crisis, the trigger for the by-election was the resignation of Liberal incumbent John Alexander effective 11 November 2017. A few weeks following the increased clarity which came from the judgment of the High Court of Australia sitting as the Court of Disputed Returns on 27 October 2017 further determining dual citizenship ineligibility under Section 44 of the Constitution, Alexander resigned due to a belief that he may have held British citizenship at the time of his nomination and election, meaning he would be ineligible under Section 44 of the Constitution to sit in the Parliament of Australia. Alexander renounced any British citizenship he may have held, or otherwise been eligible for, in order to nominate for election again.

Alexander won the 2017 Bennelong by-election despite an approximate five percent two-party swing away to Labor candidate Kristina Keneally which made the seat marginal.

2019 election
Alexander was not challenged for preselection for the 2019 federal election. With a margin of 9.7% from the 2016 election, Alexander competed against high profile neurosurgeon Brian Owler, who formerly chaired the Australian Medical Association and has worked closely with the NSW Government to be the face of a successful anti-speeding campaign for road safety. Owler's eminent persona was aided by several inflammatory remarks from Alexander, ultimately leading to a 2.8% swing away to Labor, which reduced the Liberal Party's hold on the seat to a margin of 6.9%. Alexander, who was standing for the 5th time as candidate for Bennelong, is widely regarded to have built a strong personal vote in the seat. This has led to Bennelong having a relatively stable two party preferred result from the last 3 federal elections, in the Coalition's favour. Alexander declared victory shortly after counting had passed 50%.

2022 election

On 12 November 2021, Alexander revealed that he would not contest the seat at the forthcoming federal election. ABC election analyst Antony Green pointed to the loss of Alexander's high personal vote as a vulnerability for the Coalition, giving the Labor Party a strong chance to reclaim the seat it had lost with Maxine McKew in 2010. Former Ryde mayor and Labor candidate Jerome Laxale won the seat, with a 7.9% swing to his favour. This marked the second time the seat was won by Labor since the 2007 election.

Members

Election results

Demographics
Demographic information is recorded in the Australian Bureau of Statistics 2011 census profile.

References

External links
 Division of Bennelong – Australian Electoral Commission

Electoral divisions of Australia
Constituencies established in 1949
1949 establishments in Australia